Jamie Gonoud (born 1992/1993) is a Gaelic footballer who plays for Tyrrellspass and at senior level for the Westmeath county team. He plays as a corner-back.

He made his first championship appearance with Westmeath in 2013 but really nailed down a place in the Westmeath team when Westmeath reached the final of 2016 Leinster Senior Football Championship. He received a black card against Laois in the 2021 Leinster Senior Football Championship. Kildare defeated Westmeath in the 2022 Leinster Senior Football Championship but Gonoud scored a goal and was named on the team of the week, the only Westmeath player included.

Gonoud was part of the Westmeath side that won the 2022 Tailteann Cup, playing in the final.

At college level, he was captain of Maynooth in the Sigerson Cup.

Honours
Westmeath
 Tailteann Cup (1): 2022
National football league (2):2017/2019
O'Byrne Cup (1):[[2019]

References

1990s births
Living people
Gaelic football backs
Tyrrellspass Gaelic footballers
Westmeath inter-county Gaelic footballers